Henry "Hy" Sandham  (24 May 1842 – 21 June 1910) was a Canadian painter and illustrator. He was the brother of author and numismatist Alfred Sandham.

Biography 
Born in Montreal, Sandham decided at an early age to pursue an artistic career, and was employed in William Notman's photographic studio at the age of 14. By 18, he was an assistant to Notman's partner John Arthur Fraser, who managed the studio's art department. As there was no art school in Montreal at the time, Sandham learned his craft from Fraser, as well as local artists Otto Reinhold Jacobi, Adolphe Vogt, and C. J. Way. When Fraser left Montreal in 1868 to open a Toronto branch of Notman and Fraser, Sandham became the new head of the art department. He became partners with Notman in 1877 and the studio was renamed Notman and Sandham. This partnership lasted until 1882.

The Notman studio was renowned for its composite photographs, consisting of carefully posed photographs of individuals mounted on painted backgrounds, a technique devised by Sandham. One particularly challenging composite, consisting of more than 300 separate people, won an award at the 1878 Exposition Universelle in Paris.

In 1877, he began doing illustrations for Scribner’s Monthly, with his first piece accompanying an article by William George Beers. He then followed up with his own article in November 1878, and illustrations for a four-part series by George Monro Grant in 1880. All of these efforts led him to be named a charter member of the Royal Canadian Academy of Arts, founded in 1880.

In 1865, Sandham married Agnes Fraser, the sister of his mentor. In early 1880, Sandham and his wife toured England and France. In December, they were visiting Boston, Massachusetts, intending only stay for a short while to complete some portrait commissions, but instead they ended up staying there for nearly twenty years. It was at this time when he decided to focus more on art and less on business. In 1882, The Century Magazine (the successor to Scribner's) sent him on assignment with Helen Hunt Jackson to Southern California to investigate the lives of Mission Indians. That work was published in 1883 and eventually formed the basis of her 1884 best-selling novel Ramona, for which Sandham also supplied illustrations (in a 1900 edition). Besides his illustrations, he was also known for portraits, including one of Canadian Prime Minister John A. Macdonald, and his historic paintings. During his period in Boston, his works were regularly shown at the Boston Art Club and the American Watercolor Society of New York, and he exhibited at Hermann Wunderlich’s New York gallery in 1888 as well as the World's Columbian Exposition (1893), Cotton States and International Exposition (1895), and Tennessee Centennial and International Exposition (1897).  His mural of the Battle of Lexington, The Birth of Liberty, appeared on two United States postage stamps issued to commemorate the event, one in 1925 and another in 1975.

Sandham moved to London in 1901, and continued his career there, with works shown at the Royal Academy of Arts from 1905 to 1908. His wife died in 1906, and he died in 1910. He is buried in Kensal Green Cemetery.

Gallery

Record Sale Prices
At the Cowley Abbott Auction, Important Canadian Art (Sale 2), December 1, 2022, Lot #111, Catching Waterlilies (1889), oil on canvas, 24 x 34.5 ins (61 x 87.6 cms ), Auction Estimate: $50,000.00 - $60,000.00, realized a price of $156,000.00.

Associations 
 Art Association of Montreal
 Boston Art Club
 Boston Society of Watercolor Painters
 Copley Society
 Ontario Society of Artists
 Paint and Clay Club
 Royal Canadian Academy of Arts
 Society of Canadian Artists

References

External links 

1842 births
1910 deaths
19th-century Canadian painters
Canadian male painters
20th-century Canadian painters
Canadian illustrators
Artists from Montreal
Burials at Kensal Green Cemetery
19th-century Canadian male artists
20th-century Canadian male artists
Members of the Royal Canadian Academy of Arts